Starcrash is a 1978 space opera film directed and co-written by Luigi Cozzi, and starring Marjoe Gortner, Caroline Munro, Christopher Plummer, David Hasselhoff and Joe Spinell. 

It is widely regarded as a "cash-in" on the unprecedented success of Star Wars. Filmed at Cinecittà studios in Rome, the film was produced independently by brothers Nat and Patrick Wachsburger, and features a musical score composed by John Barry. 

Released by New World Pictures on December 10, 1978, it received generally negative reviews from critics, but has developed a cult following.

Plot
In a distant galaxy, a starship searches for the evil Count Zarth Arn. Closing in on a planet, the ship is attacked by a mysterious weapon which drives the crew insane. Three escape pods launch during the attack, but the ship crashes into the atmosphere of the planet and is destroyed.

Meanwhile, smugglers Stella Star and Akton run into the Imperial Space Police, led by robot sheriff Elle and Police Chief Thor. Akton and Stella escape by jumping into hyperspace. When they emerge, they discover an escape pod from the attacked starship, and in it, a sole disoriented survivor. Before they can escape, they are apprehended by the police, who have tracked their hyperspace trail.

Tried and convicted of piracy, they are each sentenced to life in prison on separate prison planets. Stella manages to escape from her prison, but Elle and Thor recapture her, only to inform her the authorities have canceled her sentence; she is taken to an orbiting ship, where she is reunited with Akton. They are contacted holographically by the Emperor of the Galaxy, who thanks them for recovering the starship survivor.

He informs them that Count Zarth Arn has a secret weapon of immense power hidden away on a planet somewhere. The Emperor orders Stella and Akton to find the Count's weapon. They are offered clemency if they help find two more missing escape pods as well as the mothership, one of which may contain the Emperor's only son. With Thor and Elle accompanying them, Stella and Akton set off on their quest.

They quickly arrive at the location Akton computes for the first escape pod. Stella and Elle take a shuttle from the spaceship and land near the pod on a sandy, rocky beach. There are no living survivors. Stella meets an Amazonian warrior tribe and is escorted to their underground fortress. On arrival, Elle is ambushed, shot and left for dead, and Stella is taken captive. Stella is taken before Amazon Queen Corelia, who is in league with Zarth Arn. Elle, revealed not to have died, makes his way to the throne room, taking Corelia hostage to secure Stella's release. They escape, but the queen activates a giant female robot which chases them until they are rescued by Akton and Thor.

On an uninhabited, frozen planet, Stella and Elle investigate the mothership crash site. As with the first crash site, they find no survivors. Upon their return to the ship, Thor, who has ambushed and apparently knocked out Akton, reveals that he is an agent of Zarth Arn. Thor locks Stella and Elle outside on the planet's surface, where the temperature drops thousands of degrees at night, but Elle is able to preserve Stella's life by using his energy to keep her heart going while they freeze over in the snow. Meanwhile, Akton revives and battles Thor, killing him and subsequently rescuing Elle and Stella.

Approaching the planet of the third escape pod, their ship comes under attack from the same weapon seen at the beginning of the film, but Akton steers the ship through it, saving them. Stella and Elle, inspecting the pod wreckage, are attacked by cavemen who smash Elle to pieces and abduct Stella, but a man in a golden mask arrives, firing lasers through his eyes, and rescues her. He is revealed to be the Emperor's son, Prince Simon. They are again attacked and overpowered by the cavemen, but Akton appears and fights them off with his laser sword; he then reveals that they are standing on the Count's weaponized planet.

Arriving at an underground laboratory, the three are captured by the guards. The Count appears and reveals his plan to use them as bait to bring the Emperor to the planet and then have his weapon self-destruct, destroying the planet, the Emperor and all three of them. He leaves, ordering his two robot golems to keep the group there. Akton engages them in a laser sword duel and defeats the robots, but is mortally wounded and fades away. The Emperor arrives at the planet and fires a green ray from his flagship to "stop time" for three minutes, allowing them all to escape as the planet explodes behind them.

A huge battle commences between the Emperor's armada and the Count's, with the Emperor's soldiers storming the Count's space station; however, the attack fails and the victorious Count gets ready to destroy the Emperor's home planet. With no further options left, the Emperor decides to use a massive space station, the Floating City, to ram the Count's space station in a 4th dimensional attack, “Starcrash”. Elle has been rebuilt by the Emperor's men. Stella and Elle volunteer to smash the City into the Count's station. They fly the City towards the space station and manage to escape together just as their station crashes into the Count's, finally winning the war.

Stella and Elle are picked up by Simon and the two humans embrace. The movie ends with the Emperor delivering a short victory speech.

Cast
 Caroline Munro as Stella Star, a young smuggler, who is the best astro-pilot in the whole universe. She and her companion Akton end up helping the Emperor after a short prison sentence. Munro's voice was re-dubbed by an uncredited Candy Clark.
 Marjoe Gortner as Akton, Stella's loyal sidekick, human in appearance but also endowed with considerable mystical powers (including the power to restore people to life). Nothing is truly explained about his nature or his origins. He fights with a laser sword similar to a Star Wars lightsaber.
 Judd Hamilton as Elle, a powerful robot policeman endowed with emotions who ends up helping Stella and Akton. Apparently destroyed by cavemen on the third planet, he comes back later after being repaired by the Emperor's men. Hamilton's voice was re-dubbed by an uncredited Hamilton Camp.
 David Hasselhoff as Prince Simon, the Emperor's only son and the sole survivor of Zarth Arn's assault on his ship.
 Christopher Plummer as The Emperor, the known universe's benevolent and wise ruler, whose only son has disappeared after an encounter with the space forces of evil Count Zarth Arn.
 Joe Spinell as Count Zarth Arn, a megalomaniac renegade, who is bent on dethroning the Emperor and proclaiming himself supreme ruler of the universe.
 Robert Tessier as Thor, Chief of the Imperial State Police, and Elle's superior, he turns out to be a traitor working for Zarth Arn. He knocks out Akton on the second planet, believing him dead, but is then killed by Akton, who is able to deflect laser blasts with his hands.
 Nadia Cassini as Corelia, Queen of the Amazon women on the first planet that Stella and her crew visit. She is an ally of Count Zarth Arn.
Source:

Production
In an interview with Variety, director Luigi Cozzi described Starcrash as "science fantasy" as opposed to science fiction. Cozzi also stated that although people assume Starcrash was an attempt to capitalize on the popularity of Star Wars, the design of the picture and its script were developed prior to the release of Star Wars. The film's producer and screenwriter, Nat Wachsberger, and his son, producer Patrick Wachsberger, who had just developed the American production company Film Enterprises Productions, signed on to the film in May 1977 during the Cannes Film Festival after viewing sample work created by Cozzi for investors.

Principal photography began on October 15, 1977 at the Cinecittà studios in Rome, Italy. The Hollywood Reporter stated that shooting also took place in Morocco, Tunisia and in Hollywood. Roberto Girometti and Giuseppe Lanci are credited with "additional photography". The film was scheduled to be completed by mid-December 1977. The budget was $4 million.

Plummer said of the filming, "Give me Rome any day. I'll do porno in Rome, as long as I can get to Rome. Getting to Rome was the greatest thing that happened in that for me. I think it was only about three days in Rome on that one. It was all shot at once". Discussing his role as the Emperor, he said, "How can you play the Emperor of The Universe? What a wonderful part to play. It puts God in a very dicey moment, doesn't it? He's very insecure, God, when the Emperor’s around."

Cozzi stated that the miniatures were completed by Italian artists, while American developers were recruited for the special effects, including snorkel photography, computer photography and mechanical effects. Shooting took over six months and was frequently brought to a halt due to financing problems. The film was originally made for American International Pictures, but after seeing the final cut, they declined to release it. New World Pictures stepped in instead.

Soundtrack
The score for Starcrash was composed and conducted by veteran composer John Barry. The soundtrack was given a limited release of 1,500 copies by BSX Records in December 2008, and features 14 tracks of score.

"Starcrash Main Title" (2:36)
"Escape Into Hyperspace" (1:49)
"Captured" (2:09)
"Launch Adrift" (1:42)
"Beach Landing" (2:09)
"The Ice Planet/Heading for Zarkon" (3:03)
"The Emperor's Speech" (3:17)
"Strange Planet/The Troggs Attack" (2:37)
"Akton Battles the Robots" (2:18)
"Network Ball Attack" (1:00)
"Space War" (4:40)
"Goodbye Akton" (3:34)
"Starcrash End Title" (2:57)
"Starcrash Suite" (7:14)

Release and reception
The film premiered in Los Angeles on March 7, 1979. At the 7th Saturn Awards, it was nominated for the Best International Film.

In a contemporary review, Variety noted that the film had a "weak screenplay" and that Cozzi's direction "seemed to have no apparent plan". Variety commented that "what is surprising for a picture of this genre, however, is the lacklustre photography by Paul Beeson and Roberto D'Ettorre and special effects by Armando Valcauda and German Natali", and that the "photography almost never convinces that this is actually taking place anywhere but on the movie screen and special effects seem little more than poor imitations of what's been done before". The Monthly Film Bulletin noted the "mediocre special effects and a clumsily protracted finale", but stated that Starcrash "intermittently achieves a kind of lunatic appeal as it lurches pell-mell from one casually fabricated climax to the next".

A retrospective review by Kurt Dahlke of DVD Talk said, "Starcrash is a masterpiece of unintentionally bad filmmaking. Pounded out in about 18 months seemingly as an answer to Star Wars, Luigi Cozzi's knock-off buzzes around with giddy brio, mixing ridiculous characters with questionably broad acting, an incredibly simple yet still nonsensical plot derivative to Star Wars, and budget special effects that transcend into the realm of real art. It's a completely ridiculous movie, that's great to watch with a few friends and a beer or two. And it still manages to make my jaw drop". R. L. Shaffer of IGN gave the film a rating of 10/10, declaring it the "single greatest sci-fi camp fest ever put on celluloid" and put it in a league with cult classics like Troll 2, Riki-Oh: The Story of Ricky and The Room. On Rotten Tomatoes, the film has an aggregate score of 29% based on 2 positive and 5 negative critic reviews.

In 2015, Starcrash was chosen by Rolling Stone as one of the 50 Best Sci-Fi Movies of the 1970s.

In popular culture 
The film was featured on the movie-mocking television show Mystery Science Theater 3000 in 2017.

The film was the subject of an episode of the podcast How Did This Get Made? recorded at the Dominion Energy Center in Richmond, Virginia on July 20, 2019.

References

Sources

External links
 
 
 Starcrash at the Internet Archive
 
 Starcrash B-Movie Review at www.badmovies.org
 Star Crash - Scontri stellari oltre la Terza Dimensione at terrediconfine.eu 
 "Scomuniche stellari oltre la terza dimensione. Conversazione con Luigi Cozzi su fantascienza e religione" interview by Stefano Bigliardi, L'Ateo 3/112 (2017) pp. 26-29 

1978 films
1970s science fiction action films
1970s English-language films
1970s American films
1970s Italian films
American science fantasy films
American science fiction action films
American space adventure films
American space opera films
Films scored by John Barry (composer)
Films directed by Luigi Cozzi
Films set on fictional planets
Italian science fiction action films
New World Pictures films
Films shot at Cinecittà Studios
Films shot in Rome
Films shot in Morocco
Films shot in Tunisia
Films shot in Los Angeles